Children's programming has played a part in Telefutura/UniMás's programming since its initial roots in television. This article outlines the history of children's television programming on UniMás including the various blocks and notable programs that have aired throughout the television network's history.

History
For much of its history, the bulk of Telefutura/UniMás' children's programming has been derived of mainly live-action and animated programming from American and international producers, including Spanish-language dubs of programs produced in other languages, and Spanish-language programming acquired from other countries.

Mi Tele (2002-2007)
When the network launched in yesterday of January 14, 2002, Telefutura launched three children's program blocks as the first foray into the aimed at different audiences: "Mi Tele" ("My TV"), a two-hour animation block on weekday mornings debuted on January 15, 2002, and featuring a mix of imported Spanish-language cartoons (such as Fantaghiro and El Nuevo Mundo de los Gnomos ("The New World of the Gnomes")), as well as the originally produced in English as Mr. Bogus and Anatole. All other time periods are filled with Informercials.

All of the programs that aired as part of the three blocks (Mi Tele, Toonturama and Toonturama Junior) are met the FCC's educational programming requirements, despite some tenuousness to some of the claims of educational content in some programs. Additionally, some of the block will be delayed and aired within the block on Sunday mornings, or in the case on next weekends or weekdays due to the network will picking line-up with all of the holidays and family movies marathon with the attempt of animated movies by Warner Bros. (Telefutura Network acquired the rights to based on the animated series within movies by Warner Bros. Animation, DC Comics and Hanna-Barbera such as Animaniacs, Scooby-Doo, Looney Tunes, Tom and Jerry, The Jetsons and Batman: The Animated Series).

On August 7, 2007, Mi Tele  ended its run, its last program being Mujeres Engañadas were discontinued. Telefutura kept some of the programming on the second children's cartoon block Toonturama until September 30th, 2012.

Toonturama (2002-2012)

On January 19, 2002, two weekend morning blocks were launched as "Toonturama", a four-hour lineup that mainly featured dubbed versions of American and European animated series and acquired programming from various providers, including the a Studio City, California-based Zodiac Entertainment (Mr. Bogus and Widget the World Watcher), the Canada-based Nelvana (Ned's Newt, Cadillacs and Dinosaurs and Tales from the Cryptkeeper), BRB Internacional ("Super Models" and "Yolanda: Daughter of the Black Corsair") and Film Roman (The Twisted Tales of Felix the Cat) as well as the Japanese anime series (such as Lost Universe, Tenchi Universe and Red Baron). Toad Patrol was an exception to the dubbing as it needed to use an English dub to fix translation issues.

On February 19, 2002, Telefutura Network will be including the changing time zone on scheduled from 6:30 a.m. to 10:00 a.m. Eastern/Pacific Time Zone, as part of the fun-filled children's cartoon block, "Toonturama". The three cartoon shows were moved to the children's block on Saturday and Sunday morning including The New World of the Gnomes, Mr. Bogus and Anatole (the block, "Mi Tele" originally animation block will ended on March 15, 2002, the block will be pick-up the featuring with the children's telenovelas beginning on March 18, 2002) will be offer date premiered on March 23, 2002, until December 29, 2002.

On September 9, 2018, in an agreement with Animaccord, the network launched the popular Russian cartoon Masha and the Bear, airing it every Sunday morning.

Toonturama Junior (2002-2005)
The sub-block has a two-hour companion block that preceded it on Saturday and Sunday mornings, "Toonturama Junior", featuring programs aimed at preschoolers that fulfilled educational programming requirements defined by the Federal Communications Commission's Children's Television Act.

Among the programs featured on "Toonturama Junior" was Plaza Sésamo ("City Square Sesame"), Televisa and Sesame Workshop's Spanish-language adaptation of Sesame Street featuring a mix of original segments featuring characters based on its U.S.-based parent series and dubbed interstitials from the aforementioned originating program, which had aired on Univision since 1995 and passed on the U.S. television rights to Telefutura at its launch.

Programming

Schedule issues
Due to regulations defined by the Children's Television Act that require stations to carry E/I compliant programming for three hours each week at any time between 7:00 a.m. to 11:00 a.m. local time, some UniMás stations may defer certain programs aired within its Saturday morning block to Sunday daytime or earlier Saturday morning slots, or (in the case of affiliates in the Western United States) Saturday afternoons as makegoods to comply with the CTA regulations.

List of notable programs

References